Christine of Baden-Durlach (22 April 1645 – 21 December 1705) was a German noblewoman.

She was a daughter of Frederick VI, Margrave of Baden-Durlach and his wife Christina Magdalena of the Palatinate-Zweibrücken. Her first marriage was to Albert II, Margrave of Brandenburg-Ansbach. He died in 1667, and in 1681 she married for the second time to Frederick I, Duke of Saxe-Gotha-Altenburg, widowed earlier that year. She had no children by either marriage.

External links
http://gso.gbv.de/DB=1.28/REL?PPN=004412338&RELTYPE=TT

|-
 

|-

1645 births
1705 deaths
Margravines of Germany
House of Zähringen
17th-century German women
18th-century German women
Daughters of monarchs
Remarried royal consorts